Sanctaeritae or Sanctae-ritae may refer to:
 A. sanctaeritae, several biological species
 Orimarga sanctaeritae, Alexander, 1946, a crane fly species in the genus Orimarga
 Tipula sanctaeritae, Alexander, 1946, a crane fly species in the genus Tipula